Silpo (legally Silpo-Fud) is a Ukrainian retail corporation that operates a chain of grocery stores. Headquartered in Kyiv, Ukraine, the company was founded by Volodymyr Kostelman in 2001. Today it is a leading supermarket chain in a sales structure of Fozzy Group. As of September 2018 it has 241 self-service stores in 60 cities in Ukraine. The medium retail unit is about 1440 square metres. A typical Silpo store carries from 6000 to 12000 products. It imports over 8,000 products from 850 manufacturers from over 60 countries. Own trademarks of Fozzy Group presented in "Silpo": Premiya, Premiya Riki Tiki, Premiya Select, Povna Chasha, Zelena Kraina, Protex.

Services
Vlasnyi Rakhunok — a loyalty program that allows you to receive rewards for purchases, such as bonuses and special offers, which operates in the supermarket chain and some other Fozzy Group establishments that are subordinate to Silpo, such as the chain of trinket boutiques OFFTOP.

Yezzz! — service prepaid mobile telephony for clients and guests of Silpo, which includes additional bonuses for participants of the loyalty program of the supermarket chain. It includes one tariff plan, which includes all necessary services. A starter package with a SIM card can be purchased at the supermarket checkout. Silpo also provides an opportunity to top up a mobile account at a supermarket checkout, and at the checkout of the mobile chain of electronics stores ringoo, which is part of the Fozzy Group. Network operator Yezzz! is a Vodafone Ukraine.

SilpoLovesYou! — service free Wi-Fi network in supermarkets of the network for members of the loyalty program Vlasnyi Rakhunok and prepaid cellular Yezzz!

Loko! — service of online food ordering and delivery of products from the dark store and of dishes from restaurants, which works through the Silpo mobile application.

Vilnokasa — a self-service service in supermarkets of the network, which allows you to add goods to the electronic cart in the mobile application Silpo by scanning barcodes with a smartphone camera, and pay at the self-service checkout, bypassing the cashiers.

Gallery

See also
Fozzy Group
List of supermarket chains in Ukraine
 ATB-Market

References 

Supermarkets of Ukraine
Retail companies established in 2001